Geospiza is a genus of bird in the tanager family Thraupidae. All species in the genus are endemic to the Galápagos Islands. Together with related genera, they are collectively known as Darwin's finches. Although in the past, they were classified in the bunting and American sparrow family Emberizidae, more recent studies have shown they belong in the tanager family.

Taxonomy and species list
The genus Geospiza was introduced in 1837 by the English ornithologist John Gould with the large ground finch as the type species. The member of the genus form part of a group collectively known as Darwin's finches. Although traditionally placed with the buntings and New World sparrows in the family Emberizidae, molecular phylogenetic studies have shown that Darwin's finches are members of the subfamily Coerebinae within the tanager family Thraupidae.

The genus contains the following nine species.

Hybrids 
A purported hybrid species (informally nicknamed "Big Bird") endemic to Daphne Major and formed almost four decades prior by hybridization between a vagrant Geospiza conirostris and a Geospiza fortis was also reported in 2017, though it has yet to be formally described.

References

External links
 

 
Taxa named by John Gould
Taxonomy articles created by Polbot